Dhankaul  is a rural municipality in Sarlahi District, a part of Province No. 2 in Nepal. It was formed in 2016 occupying current 7 sections (wards) from previous 7 former VDCs. It occupies an area of 45.94 km2 with a total population of 32,881.

References 

Rural municipalities of Nepal established in 2017
Populated places in Sarlahi District
Rural municipalities in Madhesh Province